Świdwie may refer to the following places in Poland:
Świdwie, a lake in north-western Poland
Świdwie, Kuyavian-Pomeranian Voivodeship (north-central Poland)
Świdwie, Gmina Sośno in Kuyavian-Pomeranian Voivodeship (north-central Poland)